Hartshill Castle is a ruined castle in the village of Hartshill on the outskirts of Nuneaton, Warwickshire. It is on Historic England's Heritage at Risk Register due to erosion, structural problems and vandalism; most notably when the castle was damaged by vandals in October 2016. 

The site is also privately owned, but can be viewed from a nearby footpath adjacent to the site of the castle.

Background
Stone Age tribes lived on the site of Hartshill Castle around 10,000 BC and they were nomads, not travelling far, but wandering, always returning to this area for flints which they needed for tools and weapons. They found them in the boulder clay at the foot of Hartshill Ridge, near the River Anker. Remains of Stone Age flints and bones of red deer and woolly rhinoceroses have been found in sand and gravel near to the river at Witherly, close to Hartshill Castle.

History
Hugh de Hadreshull built the first motte and bailey castle at Hartshill in 1125 to overlook Atherstone. The pallisades were originally made of wood and, on top of the motte, was a wooden tower which was home to the Lord of the Manor and his family, as well as being a look-out post.

By the late 13th century, Hartshill Castle was owned by Robert de Hartshill, and after he was killed at the Battle of Evesham on 4 August 1265, the castle was abandoned and fell into disrepair; during the time Robert owned the castle, the first stone structure, the chapel, was built at Hartshill Castle. John de Hartshill replaced the timber castle with a stone castle during the 14th century, with construction beginning in 1330.

Sir Anthony Cooke purchased the castle around 1550, and by the 16th century, the castle had been abandoned and Michael and Edmund Parker had built a manor house out of wattle and daub in the north-eastern corner of the castle in 1560. The manor house eventually collapsed and was demolished during the 1950s.

The castle is often damaged by vandals, such as when parts of the curtain walls were damaged and stolen on 2 October 2016.

Extant remains
Part of the moat survives on the western side of the castle, and parts of the ditch survives to the east but has been largely damaged and obscured due to the dumping of waste materials during the 20th century.

Most of the curtain walls of the stone castle built by John de Hartshill also survive, and parts of a tower and the chapel also survive, but the main entrance to the south no longer exists.

Only the chimney stack to the manor house survives. The fireplace is also preserved.

Gallery

References

Other external links 
 

Castles in Warwickshire
Ruins in Warwickshire
Scheduled monuments in Warwickshire
Structures on the Heritage at Risk register in Warwickshire
Buildings and structures in Nuneaton